Mercy-le-Bas is a commune in the Meurthe-et-Moselle department in north-eastern France.

See also
Communes of the Meurthe-et-Moselle department

References

Mercylebas